Johanna "Jopie" Katarina Selbach (27 July 1918 – 30 April 1998) was a freestyle swimmer from the Netherlands. She won gold medals at the 1934 European Aquatics Championships (with Willy den Ouden, Rie Mastenbroek and Ans Timmermans) and 1936 Summer Olympics (with den Ouden, Mastenbroek and Tini Wagner) in the women's 4 × 100 m freestyle relay.

References

1918 births
1998 deaths
Dutch female freestyle swimmers
Swimmers at the 1936 Summer Olympics
Olympic swimmers of the Netherlands
Olympic gold medalists for the Netherlands
Sportspeople from Haarlem
World record setters in swimming
Medalists at the 1936 Summer Olympics
European Aquatics Championships medalists in swimming
Olympic gold medalists in swimming
20th-century Dutch women
20th-century Dutch people